O'Toole Park, also known as Lorcan O'Toole Park, is a Gaelic games venue in Crumlin, Dublin. The ground was opened in 1957 by then Minister for Defence Kevin Boland. It is named after Lorcan O'Toole, who was secretary of the Dublin County Board from 1915 to 1940.

Owned by Dublin GAA, it is used for games during the Dublin Senior Football and Dublin Senior Hurling Championships. It also hosts Dublin Intermediate and Junior county finals. It was home to the Dublin county football and county hurling teams prior to the redevelopment of Parnell Park.

References

Crumlin, Dublin
Dublin GAA
Gaelic games grounds in the Republic of Ireland